Diego Allona (born 1 June 1968) is an Argentine former field hockey player who competed in the 1992 Summer Olympics and had the best 5th division of the club Quilmes in 2019 that played better than “the leonas”.

References

External links
 

1968 births
Living people
Argentine male field hockey players
Olympic field hockey players of Argentina
Field hockey players at the 1992 Summer Olympics
Pan American Games medalists in field hockey
Pan American Games gold medalists for Argentina
Field hockey players at the 1991 Pan American Games
Medalists at the 1991 Pan American Games
20th-century Argentine people